The 2017 Charleston Battery season was the club's 25th year of existence, their 14th season in the second tier of the United States Soccer Pyramid, and their first in the second tier since 2009. It was their seventh season in the United Soccer League as part of the Eastern Conference.

The Battery finished the season 3rd overall in the league, and 2nd in the East. They lost in the first round of the 2017 USL Playoffs.

Background 

The Battery are coming off a season where they finished the USL with 13–9–8 record, good enough to finish sixth in the Eastern Conference and 10th in the USL. They earned a berth into the 2016 USL Playoffs as the number six seed in the Eastern Bracket.  There, they beat FC Cincinnati in the first round, 2–1, before losing to Louisville City FC in the Conference Semifinals, 1–0. The Battery reached the third round of the 2016 U.S. Open Cup after beating The Villages SC, 3–0 on a forfeit. The original second round proper fixture was tied 2–2 after extra time, and the Villages won 4–2 in penalties. However, the Battery protested their use of a player cup-tied to Boca Raton FC. The appeal was approved, and the Battery reached the third round where they lost in extra-time to Jacksonville Armada FC in the third round.

Squad

Non-competitive

Carolina Challenge Cup

Competitive

USL

Table

Results

U.S. Open Cup

References

External links 
Battery Official Website

Charleston Battery seasons
Charleston Battery
Charleston Battery
2017 in sports in South Carolina